Deflazacort (trade name Calcort among others) is a glucocorticoid used as an anti-inflammatory and immunomodulatory agent.
It was patented in 1965 and approved for medical use in 1985. The U.S. Food and Drug Administration (FDA) considers it to be a first-in-class medication for Duchenne Muscular Dystrophy.

Medical uses 
The manufacturer lists the following uses for deflazacort:

In the United States, deflazacort is approved for the treatment of duchenne muscular dystrophy in people over the age of two.

Adverse effects 
Deflazacort carries the risks common to all corticosteroids, including immune suppression, decreased bone density, and endocrine insufficiency. In clinical trials, the most common side effects (>10% above placebo) were Cushing's-like appearance, weight gain, and increased appetite.

Pharmacology

Mechanism of action 

Deflazacort is an inactive prodrug which is metabolized rapidly to the active drug 21-desacetyldeflazacort.

Relative potency 
Deflazacort's potency is around 70–90% that of prednisone.  A 2017 review found its activity of 7.5 mg of deflazacort is approximately equivalent to 25 mg cortisone, 20 mg hydrocortisone, 5 mg of prednisolone or prednisone, 4 mg of methylprednisolone or triamcinolone, or 0.75 mg of betamethasone or dexamethasone.  The review noted that the drug has a high therapeutic index, being used at initial oral doses ranging from 6 to 90 mg, and probably requires a 50% higher dose to induce the same demineralizing effect as prednisolone.  Thus it has "a smaller impact on calcium metabolism than any other synthetic corticosteroid, and therefore shows a lower risk of growth rate retardation in children and of osteoporosis" in the elderly, and comparatively small effects on carbohydrate metabolism, sodium retention, and hypokalemia.

History 
In January 2015, the FDA granted fast track status to Marathon Pharmaceuticals to pursue approval of deflazacort as a potential treatment for Duchenne muscular dystrophy, a rare, "progressive and fatal disease" that affects boys. Although deflazacort was approved by the FDA for use in treatment of Duchenne muscular dystrophy on February 9, 2017, Marathon CEO announced on February 13, 2017, that the launch of deflazacort (Emflaza) would be delayed amidst controversy over the steep price Marathon was asking for the drug in the United States - $89,000 per year, which is "roughly 70 times" more than it would cost overseas. Because deflazacort is an older drug which has been long-approved in some other countries, it is now available in many places as an inexpensive generic.  For example, in Canada deflazacort can be purchased for around $1 per tablet.

Deflazacort is sold in the United States under the brand name Emflaza after PTC Therapeutics, Inc. acquired all rights to Emflaza on March 16, 2017. Deflazacort is sold in the United Kingdom under the trade name Calcort; in Brazil as Cortax, Decortil, Defcort and Deflanil; in India as Moaid, Zenflav, Defolet, DFZ, Decotaz, and DefZot; in Bangladesh as Xalcort; in Panama as Zamen; Spain as Zamene; and in Honduras as Flezacor.

The U.S. Food and Drug Administration approved deflazacort to treat people age five years and older with Duchenne muscular dystrophy (DMD), a rare genetic disorder that causes progressive muscle deterioration and weakness. Emflaza is a corticosteroid that works by decreasing inflammation and reducing the activity of the immune system. NDA 208684 was approved on February 9, 2017, as a Type 1- new molecular entity with orphan status.

References

External links 
 

Acetate esters
Corticosteroid cyclic ketals
Corticosteroid esters
Glucocorticoids
Oxazolines
Pregnanes
Prodrugs